George Horan (born 19 February 1982) is an English footballer who plays as a defender for Connah's Quay Nomads.

Career

In 2005, Horan signed for Welsh side Rhyl, helping them win the league and 2005–06 Welsh Cup. In 2010, he signed for Chester in the English eighth tier, helping them earn 3 consecutive promotions to the English fifth tier. In 2012, he signed for Welsh club Connah's Quay Nomads, helping them win the league, their first top flight title. On 7 July 2021, Horan scored for Connah's Quay Nomads during a 2–2 draw with Alashkert, becoming the oldest player ever to score a goal in the UEFA Champions League.

References

External links

 

1982 births
Chester F.C. players
Connah's Quay Nomads F.C. players
Cymru Premier players
English expatriate footballers
English footballers
Expatriate footballers in Wales
Living people
National League (English football) players
Northern Premier League players
Rhyl F.C. players
Wrexham A.F.C. players